Khan in Iran may refer to:
 Khan, Sistan and Baluchestan
 Khan, West Azerbaijan

See also
 Kahn, Iran (disambiguation)